George Herbert Watts (18 February 1867 – 22 April 1949) was an English first-class cricketer active 1890–92 who played for Surrey. He was born and died in Cambridge.

References

1867 births
1949 deaths
English cricketers
Surrey cricketers
Cambridgeshire cricketers